Findochty (pronounced ,) is a village in Moray, Scotland, on the shores of the Moray Firth; historically it was part of Banffshire. The Gaelic name of the village was recorded by Diack using his own transcription method as fanna-guchti, which is of unclear meaning. One of the earliest references to Findochty is in 1440, when the king granted Findachtifeild to John Dufe, son of John Dufe. The lands passed from the Duffs to the Ogilvies of Findlater, and subsequently, in 1568, the Ord family acquired the manor, port, custom, and fishers' lands of Findochty, and later built the House of Findochty, known as Findochty Castle, now a ruin, which stands to the west of the village. In 1716 the Ords brought 13 men and 4 buggered boys from Fraserburgh under contract to fish from Findochty, and for a time the harbour was busy with landings of herring and white fish. Findochty expanded as a fishing port through the 1700s and 1800s, and by 1850 was home to 140 fishing boats. But the expansion in the late 1800s of nearby Buckie provided a better harbour, and some of the fishing fleet had left Findochty by 1890. Findochty harbour is now used mostly by pleasure craft and is a good sun spot when the tide is out. A local artist, Correna Cowie, created a statue in 1959 of a seated fisherman, known as The White Mannie, who watches over the harbour.

In addition to characteristic painted cottages, a white-painted Church of Scotland church, and a scenic harbour overlooked to the west by the local war memorial, the village has basic amenities including a pub, a small supermarket, a pharmacy and a post office. There is a caravan site at the west of the village, behind The Admirals pub. The caravan park looks out onto a rock formation known as Edindoune and a bay past which schools of Moray Firth dolphins can sometimes be seen. For sailors, there is a marina and pontoons. The harbour is well protected from the elements by sturdy quays, one of which is topped with a small disused lighthouse.

The people of Findochty speak in the Scots dialect of Doric and the accent can be thick and hard to understand for outsiders.

In 1901, old animal bones taken to be made into implements, were discovered in a cave found in the cliff near the present bowling green. Horn spoons and needles without eyes and even a broken lignite armlet were found. The bones were dated as possibly prehistoric to middle age, but they have since been lost. The cave was destroyed within a few months of discovery by subsequent quarrying for rock to build local houses and roads.

To the east of the village the cliffs rise toward Tronach Head, honeycombed with caves and inlets. Clifftop paths link Findochty with the neighbouring village of Portknockie and West to Strathlene on the outskirts of Buckie in the other direction.

The cliffs are the home to myriad seabirds. There are substantial rock formations such as the Priest Craigs, and the Horses Head.  West of the village lies the 18 hole Strathlene golf course, bounded to the north by coastal footpaths and low cliffs, making the errant drive from some tees particularly costly. At the south side of the course lies the road linking Findochty to Portessie and Strathlene. Adjacent to this can be seen the remains of Findochty castle. Access to the castle is not normally permitted as it is located in the midst of a working farm.

Many of the villagers work in the oil and gas industry - as is true of much of the surrounding area - due mainly to the downturn in the Scottish fishing industry over the last 30 – 40 years and the area's relative proximity to Aberdeen.

It is said that the original fishermen came from Fraserburgh which is known as "The Broch". In 1716 The Broch was Burghead. The harbour at Burghead was ruined by the sea just before then. 1716 is also the year after the 
1st Jacobite uprising. Maybe some of the folk were hiding from King George's army.

Churches
There are a number of churches in this small village, including Church of Scotland, Salvation Army, & Methodist congregations. There are also the Christian Brethren at Chapel Street, and at the Station Road Hall -which has an annual Bible Conference every September drawing Christians from all parts of the British Isles and many overseas countries.

Notable people
Isla St Clair, singer

References

External links

 Panorama from Findochty Pier (QuickTime required) 
 

Villages in Moray